Ab Kettleby Manor is an early 17th-century house in the village of Ab Kettleby, Leicestershire. Built of ironstone with a central brick chimney the house is cruciform in plan.

Notes and references

Sources
 Pevsner, Nikolaus (1960). The Buildings of England: Leicestershire and Rutland (Harmondsworth: Penguin Books)

Country houses in Leicestershire
Grade II* listed buildings in Leicestershire